The men's 20 kilometres walk event at the 1995 Pan American Games was held in Mar del Plata on 18 March.

Held on the track (50 laps), the two Mexicans and Pérez dominated the race as the others fell off the back of the lead pack.  With two laps to go, the Mexicans used a team effort to box Pérez in behind a lapped walker, losing a couple of strides.  A disgusted, future Olympic gold medalist, Pérez threw down his hat and took off in chase.  Pérez caught García, but it wasn't until the last 100 metres that he challenged Segura.  Responding to the challenge, Segura managed to cross the finish line first.  After the race was over, the chief judge located Segura to show him the red paddle for losing contact on the final straight.

Results

References

Athletics at the 1995 Pan American Games
1995